Captain Derek Knee (22 October 1922 – 18 March 2014) was a British Army intelligence officer of the British Army during World War II. He was the interpreter and translator for Field Marshal Sir Bernard Montgomery, commander of the Anglo-Canadian 21st Army Group, at the German surrender at Lüneburg Heath in Germany on 3 May 1945.

Early life and service in World War II
Knee attended Cheltenham Grammar School where his father was the headmaster and he spent a summer with a family in Germany which helped him to become fluent in the language. He then read Modern Languages at Christ's College, Cambridge for a year until he was commissioned as an officer in the Dorset Regiment. His language skills led to postings to a course on the interrogation of Prisoners of War and to a censorship unit in London. After D-Day he served at Second Army Headquarters under General Miles Dempsey, identifying German units and estimating their strengths.

German Surrender
On 2 May 1945 Knee was told to report to Field Marshal Montgomery’s 21st Army Group Tactical Headquarters on Lüneburg Heath the next day where a German delegation arrived with a letter from Field Marshal Wilhelm Keitel which he translated for Montgomery. He reported that they did not have the authority to agree to the unconditional surrender terms stipulated by Montgomery and they were provided with a lunch with wine and brandy. The next day they returned with another delegate and signed the surrender document in a carpeted tent witnessed by war correspondents. Knee was later directed to travel to Flensburg to take Karl Dönitz into custody and transport him to the airport. Upon his return to Lüneburg he saw the body of Heinrich Himmler who had committed suicide in British custody.

Later life
Upon his return to his studies at Cambridge University Knee switched to an Economics course and he became assistant general secretary at the International Association of Department Stores in Paris and Geneva. Upon his retirement he moved to Barry, Vale of Glamorgan, Wales. He was married with two sons.

See also
 German surrender at Lüneburg Heath

References

1922 births
2014 deaths
Military personnel from Gloucestershire
Alumni of Christ's College, Cambridge
People educated at Pate's Grammar School
People from Cheltenham
British Army personnel of World War II
Dorset Regiment officers